Manfred Abelein (20 October 1930, Stuttgart, Württemberg - 17 January 2008) was a German politician. He was a representative of the German Christian Democratic Union.

Education and Work 

Abelein graduated with a degree in law, political science and economics. He later worked as a professor at the University of Regensburg, where he taught politics and public law. He was well known for his regular course on "The Current Problems in Fiscal Policy".

Member of Parliament 

Abelein was a member of the German Bundestag from 1965, when he succeeded Rudolf Vogel, until 1990. He represented the constituency of Aalen-Heidenheim in Baden-Württemberg, and received over 50% of the votes every time he ran for election. In an article in the German newspaper Die Zeit, he presented himself as a conservative politician. He was replaced in office by Georg Brunnhuber in 1990, who still holds the seat as of 2009.

Abelein was also a member of the NATO Parliamentary Assembly, of which he was vice-president from 1985 to 1987.

Mountain Climber and Pilot 

Abelein was a passionate mountain climber. In 1977, while on a trip to help set up the Konrad Adenauer Foundation in South America, he climbed Mount Illimani (6,438m) in Bolivia. He also climbed the Hohe Munde (2,662m) in Austria in 1978. Between March and May 1980 he participated in the first European expedition to Tibet for many years, which climbed Mount Shishapangma (8,013m), the fourteenth highest mountain in the world.

A trained pilot, Abelein flew non-stop from New York City to Cologne in 1979.

See also 
List of German Christian Democratic Union politicians

References

External links 
 Literature by and about Manfred Abelein in the German National Library catalogue

1930 births
2008 deaths
Politicians from Stuttgart
Members of the Bundestag for Baden-Württemberg
Members of the Bundestag 1987–1990
Members of the Bundestag 1983–1987
Members of the Bundestag 1980–1983
Members of the Bundestag 1976–1980
Members of the Bundestag 1972–1976
Members of the Bundestag 1969–1972
Members of the Bundestag 1965–1969
Members of the Bundestag for the Christian Democratic Union of Germany
People from the Free People's State of Württemberg